Nathaniel Brassey (c. 1697–1765)  of Roxford, Hertingfordbury, Hertfordshire and Lombard St., London was a British banker and  politician who sat in the House of Commons from 1734 to 1761.
 
Brassey was the eldest son of John Brassey,a Quaker banker of Lombard Street, and his wife  Mary Lane. His father   was an assistant in the Sword Blade Company and traded with his son-in-law, Sir George Caswall, as a banker under the name  Brassey and Caswall.  Brassey was his father's partner in the banking firm by 1716 . His first wife was  Mary. By 1730 the banking firm  was known as Nathaniel Brassey and Lee. In 1737, Brassey succeeded his father, who by his purchase of  Roxford, near Hertford in 1700, had established an electoral interest in Hertford.
 
Brassey stood for Parliament at St Albans at a by-election in 1730, but was defeated in a contest. He was returned unopposed as Member of Parliament for Hertford at the 1734 British general election. In 1739 he was one of the Members chosen to prepare a bill to prevent fraud and abuses in gold and silver wares. As a result, he received the thanks of the Goldsmiths’ Company for his ‘indefatigable pains’ Also in 1739,   with other Hertfordshire Members, he supported a motion for the repeal of the Test Act.  Otherwise, he voted  regularly with the Government. He was returned unopposed again as MP for Hertford in  1741 and 1747.
 
Brassey was re-elected unopposed at the  1754 British general election. He continued to support the administration. In 1757, he subscribed £10,000 to the loan. He did not stand again at the  1761 British general election.

Brassey married as his second wife Martha Phillips on 17 October 1751. He  died on  29 September 1765, aged 68 leaving a daughter by his first marriage and a son by his second.

References

1690s births
1765 deaths
Members of the Parliament of Great Britain for English constituencies
British MPs 1734–1741
British MPs 1741–1747
British MPs 1747–1754
British MPs 1754–1761